Cordillera de Queule is a minor mountain range in the border of La Araucanía Region and Los Ríos Region, southern Chile. The forested hills of Cordillera de Queule makes up the northern boundary of Lingue Rivers drainage basin.

See also
Chilean Coast Range
Cordillera de Nahuelbuta
Cordillera de Mahuidanchi

References

Mountain ranges of Chile
Landforms of Los Ríos Region
Landforms of Araucanía Region
Chilean Coast Range